Carmen Isabel Jaramillo Velarde (born 26 December 1994) is a Panamanian model and beauty pageant titleholder who was crowned as Señorita Panamá 2020 and Miss Earth Panamá 2015. She represented Panama at Miss Earth 2015 but unplaced. She also represented her country at Miss Universe 2020 held on 16 May 2021.

Pageantry

Miss Panamá 2014
Carmen joined the Miss Panamá 2014 pageant where she represented the state of Panamá Oeste. She won the "Miss Panamá Latinoamerica del Mundo" title but she resigned three days after the pageant.

2015: Miss Earth and Reina Hispanoamericana
Part of her training as Miss Earth Panama, Carmen represented Panama first at Reina Hispanoamericana 2015 in Santa Cruz, Bolivia. She competed with 23 other delegates where she was hailed as one of the Top 9 finalists. The competition was won by Sofía del Prado of Spain.

Being the winner of Miss Earth Panama 2015, Carmen has become Panama's representative at the Miss Earth 2015 and tried to succeed Jamie Herrell as the next Miss Earth.

Señorita Panamá 2019
Jaramillo joined the Señorita Panamá 2019 pageant where she represented the state of Panamá Este where she finished as 1st Runner-up. She is designated to represent Panama in the Miss United Continents 2019 where she placed in the Top 10.

Miss Universe 2020
On 9 April, the Señorita Panamá Organization announced Jaramillo as the new Señorita Panamá for represented her country at the Miss Universe 2020 pageant.

Carmen represented Panamá at the 69th Miss Universe pageant on May 16, 2021 at Seminole Hard Rock Hotel & Casino, Hollywood, Florida, United States.

External links
Carmen Jaramillo at Miss Earth official website
Miss Earth Panama 2015 Eco-Beauty Video

References

Miss Earth 2015 contestants
Living people
Panamanian female models
Panamanian beauty pageant winners
Miss Universe 2020 contestants
Señorita Panamá
1994 births